("Defenders of the Homeland") is the national anthem of Tunisia; the text was written by Mostafa Saadeq Al-Rafe'ie and Aboul-Qacem Echebbi.

History
The lyrics come from a poem written in the 1930s by Lebanese-born Egyptian poet Mostafa Saadeq Al-Rafe'ie. Although some say the melody was composed by Mohammed Abdel Wahab, Tunisian musicologist Salah El Mahdi claims the melody was composed by the poet  while the original music for the poem was composed by Zakariyya Ahmad.

The last verses of the lyrics were written by Aboul-Qacem Echebbi. According to El Mahdi, these verses were appended to the lyrics in June 1955 by nationalist Mongi Slim.

Known as the "Hymn of the Revolution", it was sung during the meetings of the ruling party, the Neo Destour, which later changed its name to the Socialist Destourian Party. "Humat al-Hima" was temporarily used as a national anthem between the end of the monarchy on 25 July 1957, when it replaced the "Salam al-Bey", and 20 March 1958, when it was replaced by "Ala Khallidi". "Humat al-Hima" was later brought back again following the coup d'état that brought Zine El Abidine Ben Ali to power on 7 November 1987.

Lyrics
On occasions requiring brevity, a short version is sung consisting of the chorus, the third verse (not repeated) and the chorus again.

Notes

References

External links
 Tunisia: Humat al-Hima – Audio of the national anthem of Tunisia, with information and lyrics (archive link)

Tunisian music
National symbols of Tunisia
African anthems
National anthem compositions in A-flat major